Andrei Tsaryov (born August 30, 1975) is a Russian former professional ice hockey goaltender, who played for the Russia in WC 1999 and WC 2003. After completing his career as a player, he became a coach.

Awards and honors

References

External links
Biographical information and career statistics from Eliteprospects.com, or The Internet Hockey Database

1975 births
Living people
HC CSKA Moscow players
Ak Bars Kazan players
HC Neftekhimik Nizhnekamsk players
Torpedo Nizhny Novgorod players
Keramin Minsk players
Sportspeople from Nizhny Novgorod